A World on End is an EP by the Pennsylvania rock band Katsu and the final studio recording by the band. The EP is a compilation of songs from the band's earlier studio recordings with the addition of the new song "Please Don't Start".

Track listing
"The Stalkin' Song" – 4:07
"Change" – 3:28
"Brave New World" – 3:11
"She Took" – 3:03
"Please Don't Start" – 3:42
"Leave Me" – 3:18
"The Dishwasher's Love Song" – 4:23
"David & Goliath" – 3:49

Personnel
 Dennis Fallon – acoustic guitar, vocals
 Frank Yarnal – bass guitar
 William Love – guitar
 Ralph Jones – drums

2006 EPs
Katsu (band) albums